Stéphanie Van Gils is a Belgian football forward who played for RSC Anderlecht in the BeNe League. She is a member of the Belgian national team.

References

1991 births
Living people
Belgian women's footballers
People from Ravels
Belgium women's international footballers
Women's association football forwards
Super League Vrouwenvoetbal players
BeNe League players
RSC Anderlecht (women) players
Footballers from Antwerp Province